Norm Rogers (Australia), was a rugby league footballer in the New South Wales Rugby League(NSWRL) competition. Rogers, a centre, played for the Eastern Suburbs club in the years 1946–49.

Rogers is the father of Olympic swimmers Greg and Neil Rogers.

Sources
 Whiticker, Alan & Hudson, Glen (2006) The Encyclopedia of Rugby League Players, Gavin Allen Publishing, Sydney

References

Australian rugby league players
Sydney Roosters players
Living people
Year of birth missing (living people)
Place of birth missing (living people)